Scott Michael Anderson Clark (born 5 May 1977) is a New Zealand former professional tennis player.

Clark, raised in Auckland, competed on the international tour in the 1990s. A junior doubles quarter-finalist at Wimbledon, he made an ATP Tour main draw appearance at the 1995 Auckland Open and represented New Zealand in a 1995 Davis Cup tie against South Korea in Christchurch. He was beaten in his singles rubber by Lee Hyung-taik.

Ending his professional tennis career in 1996, Clark played varsity tennis while attending Harvard University, graduating in 2001 with a bachelor's degree in economics. He now works as a banker in New York City.

See also
List of New Zealand Davis Cup team representatives

References

External links
 
 
 

1977 births
Living people
New Zealand male tennis players
Harvard Crimson men's tennis players
Tennis players from Auckland